Road House 2 is a 2006 American direct-to-video action film directed by Scott Ziehl. It is the sequel to 1989's Road House. Johnathon Schaech stars as a bouncer who must protect a Louisiana bar from criminals.

Plot
D.E.A. agent Shane Tanner is the son of a legendary cooler named James Dalton (played by Patrick Swayze in the original film). Nate Tanner is Shane's uncle, and the owner of the Black Pelican, a bar located in Nate's new permanent home of Tyree, Louisiana. Nate gets a call from his rival, who is nicknamed "Wild Bill", the former Black Pelican cooler who has been trying to steal it from Nate. Wild Bill asks Nate to meet him at a pier, supposedly to discuss a truce. Nate goes to the pier and is ambushed and beaten badly by Wild Bill.

Meanwhile, in New York City, Shane, along with other agents, bust drug dealers in a night club. Shane later gets a phone call about his uncle being in the hospital and getting badly beaten. Shane gets his uncle's location and leaves for Tyree. Shane takes off for local authorities to find out who ambushed Nate. Shane decides to stay in Nate's house and run the Black Pelican in Nate's absence, much to the dismay of Wild Bill. The location is best for drug-running, as the Black Pelican is close to the border. However, like his uncle, Shane refuses to sell the bar and damages the numerous thugs that Wild Bill sends his way.

A small subplot involves Shane still looking for the murderer who killed his father, the legendary Dalton, many years ago when Shane arrived home from work (Shane was a rookie Louisiana state trooper). After Dalton's murder, Shane left town and joined the DEA as a field agent. Now, Wild Bill's boss, Miami crime syndicate kingpin Victor Cross, decides that it is time to handle matters personally, since Wild Bill's men have not been doing a good job of taking care of Shane. Shane is soon faced with impossible odds and a low number of staff members at the Black Pelican.

To rid Louisiana of Victor, Wild Bill, and their organization, Shane teams up with local school teacher Beau Hampton, who has a military background. Soon, Beau and Shane take down Wild Bill and Victor. In the end, Victor is badly beaten and left at Beau's house and Wild Bill is impaled by the symbolic black pelican at the bar.

It is revealed that Victor had wanted Shane dead for a drug bust he did on Victor long ago as a state trooper. Victor had hired Wild Bill, then a cooler at the bar, to kill Dalton. Shane decides to stay in town since he can finally be at peace after finding his father's murderers and exacting justice from them.

Cast
 Johnathon Schaech as DEA Agent Shane Tanner
 Ellen Hollman as Beau Hampton
 Richard Norton as Victor Cross 
 Jake Busey as Bill "Wild Bill" Decarie
 Will Patton as Nate Tanner
 Marisa Quinn as Nadja
 Crystal Mantecón as Sherri

Reception

Critical response
Scott Weinberg of DVD Talk rated it 2.5/5 stars and called it a predictably "mindless, silly mess" that was made to capitalize on the first film's fandom.  In a review of both films, Cam Lindsay of Exclaim! wrote that it was better to ignore the sequel and simply rewatch the original instead.

References

External links
 
 
 

2006 films
2006 direct-to-video films
Direct-to-video sequel films
2006 action thriller films
Metro-Goldwyn-Mayer direct-to-video films
Sony Pictures direct-to-video films
Films set in Louisiana
Films set in New York City
2000s English-language films
Films directed by Scott Ziehl